Gaston Médécin (8 January 1901 – 9 March 1983) was a Monegasque athlete. He competed at the 1924 Summer Olympics and the 1928 Summer Olympics. The Salle Gaston Médecin, an indoor sports arena in Fontvieille, Monaco, is named after him.

References

External links
 

1901 births
1983 deaths
Athletes (track and field) at the 1924 Summer Olympics
Athletes (track and field) at the 1928 Summer Olympics
Monegasque male long jumpers
Monegasque decathletes
Monegasque male tennis players
Olympic athletes of Monaco
Place of birth missing
Olympic decathletes